Thedford may refer to:
 Thedford, Nebraska, a village in the United States
 Thedford, Ontario, a town in Canada
 Thedford, Texas, an unincorporated community in Smith County, Texas

See also 
 Thetford (disambiguation)